Lincoln Township is one of seventeen townships in Adair County, Iowa, USA.  At the 2010 census, its population was 926.

History
Lincoln Township was organized in 1861.

Geography
According to the USGS, it contains one cemetery, Calvary.

References

External links
 US-Counties.com
 City-Data.com

Townships in Adair County, Iowa
Townships in Iowa
1861 establishments in Iowa